Srđan Ostojić (born 10 January 1983) is a retired Serbian football goalkeeper.

Honours
Gomel
 Belarusian Cup: 2011
 Belarusian Super Cup: 2012

External links
 
 Profile at FC Gomel website

1983 births
Living people
Serbian footballers
Association football goalkeepers
Serbian expatriate footballers
Serbian expatriate sportspeople in Kazakhstan
Serbian expatriate sportspeople in Belarus
Expatriate footballers in Kazakhstan
Expatriate footballers in Belarus
Expatriate footballers in Indonesia
Kazakhstan Premier League players
FK Železničar Beograd players
FK Sinđelić Beograd players
FK Bežanija players
FC Gomel players
FC Shakhtyor Soligorsk players
FK Zemun players
FK Drina Zvornik players
FC Akzhayik players
Arema F.C. players